Love Breakups Zindagi is a Hindi romantic film, directed by Sahil Sangha and produced by Zayed Khan under the banner of Sahara Motion Pictures and Born Free Entertainment. It stars Zayed Khan and Dia Mirza in the lead roles. The music is composed by the duo Salim–Sulaiman and the lyrics are penned by Javed Akhtar. The movie released on 7 October 2011.

Plot

Love Breakups Zindagi is a movie that does not try to answer the question related to love, breakups and life.

Jai (Zayed Khan) and Naina (Dia Mirza) are almost "settled" in their life but missing something or someone who will complete them. Jai feels that magic and serendipity have passed him by. Naina is a successful photographer and has taught herself that a less than fulfilling life is enough for her. But is it?

Govind (Cyrus Sahukar) has a colourful past and is on his way to another major, seemingly all wrong relationship. But what if this 'mistake' is the love he has been looking for all his life? Sheila (Tisca Chopra) has stayed single for a long time waiting for Mr. Perfect. When he does appear, will she take her chance at love, look beyond the odds that divide to see what binds them in a perfect whole?

Ritu (Umang Jain) lives on breakups and ice cream. Will she ever find a man and share a beginning and not just a closure? Arjun (Satyadeep Mishra) and Gayatri (Auritra Ghosh) are the perfect couple on the brink of a dream wedding. Will their love inspire the others to listen to their heart? Dhruv (Vaibhav Talwar) and Radhika (Pallavi Sharda) are driven workaholics ignoring the small text of their lives. Will they wake up to see what they have missed in their desire for everything?

The characters try to find personal truths, shed illusions, laugh, cry, grow and learn the biggest lesson of all: That even if you don't go looking for love, it will come looking for you.

Cast
 Zayed Khan as Jai Malhotra
 Dia Mirza as Naina Kapoor
 Shah Rukh Khan as himself (Cameo)
 Shabana Azmi as Mrs. Kapoor, Naina's Mom (Special Appearance)
 Ritesh Deshmukh as Kunal Ahuja (Special Appearance)
 Boman Irani as Mr. Thapar, Sheila's Dad (Special Appearance)
 Tisca Chopra as Sheila Thapar
 Farida Jalal as Beeji
 Soni Razdan
 Cyrus Sahukar as Govind
 Satyadeep Mishra as Arjun
 Vaibhav Talwar as Dhruv
 Auritra Ghosh as Gayatri 
 Pallavi Sharda as Radhika
 Umang Jain as Ritu

Soundtrack

Music of Love Breakups Zindagi was launched on 3 September 2011. The music is composed by the duo Salim–Sulaiman and the lyrics are penned by Javed Akhtar. The album received mostly positive reviews from critics. Sheetal Tiwari of Bollyspice awarded 3 stars saying, "All in Love, Love Breakups Zindagi, practices what it preaches in that it has songs of love, life and all that lies in between. 'Rab Rakha' and 'Chhayee Hai Tanhayee' are obviously come out on top while 'Love Love Love' and 'Rozaana' are close runners-up. In any event, there is something to be loved about each track from the soundtrack and the merchant brothers continue to remind us why they are considered as one of the best music duos of the current era." Joginder Tuteja of Bollywood Hungama gave the album 3.5 stars and stated, "This is turning out to be one real good season when it comes to romantic feel good music being churned out in Bollywood. Go for Love Breakups Zindagi, it will pleasantly surprise you."

The album also included a remix of the song "Main Se Meena Se" from the 1987 film Khudgarz, sung by Sonu Nigam and Shreya Ghoshal.

Reception

Critical response 
Love Breakups Zindagi received mixed reviews upon release. Preeti Arora from Rediff.com gave it 2 out of 5 stars, calling it predictable. Gaurav Malani of The Times of India lamented the fact that director Sahil Singha doesn't show any innovation in the storytelling of his debut venture. Writing for CNN-IBN, Rajeev Masand gave the film 2 out of 5 stars writing "Love Breakups Zindagi' is an inoffensive film that has pleasant music and neat production design. First-timer Sahil Sangha directs with an easy hand, giving the film a light-hearted feel. Alas, he's working from a script that offers nothing new or exciting to chew on. I'm going with two out of five for 'Love Breakups Zindagi'. It's a tiring retread of a once popular formula that's wearing thin now."

DNA's Akansha Naval-Shetye and  Soumyadipta Banerjee gave the film positive review saying "The director has taken a good decision by not putting an airport chase sequence in the film and the leading pair saying ‘I love you’ as they miss their flight. It is not there, hence you can go and watch the film for sure." Zee News called it a "fair attempt by a bunch of debut producers and directors."

References

External links
 
 
 

2010s Hindi-language films
Films about Indian weddings